The use of mobile phones in schools has become a controversial topic debated by students, parents, teachers and authorities. 

People who support the use of mobile phones believe that these phones are essential for safety by allowing children to communicate with their parents and guardians, could simplify many school matters, and it is important in today's world that children learn how to deal with new media properly as early as possible. Many persons also think that you should take advantage of the fact that nowadays, there is no need to memorize every fact anymore, as cell phones can be used to access all human knowledge virtually anywhere, allowing schools to shift their focus from imparting knowledge to understanding how certain things work together and promoting the development of personality, teamwork, creativity, social skills etc.

Opponents of students using mobile phones during school believe that mobile phones cause disruption and may be used inappropriately such as by cheating on tests, taking inappropriate photographs, and playing mobile games. Rather than paying attention to teachers, students are spending more time distracted by their phones.

To prevent distractions caused by mobile phones, some schools have implemented policies that restrict students from using their phones during school hours. Some administrators have attempted cell phone jamming, but this practice is illegal in certain jurisdictions. The software can be used in order to monitor and restrict phone usage to reduce distractions and prevent unproductive use. However, these methods of regulation raise concerns about privacy violation and abuse of power.

Studies
A 2015 study published in the journal Computers in Human Behavior demonstrated that among undergraduate students total usage of mobile phones, measured in number of minutes per day and not limited to school time, was "a significant and negative predictor of college students’ academic performance, objectively measured as cumulative GPA." Moreover, the abundant use of mobile technology among young people largely explains the inadequate use of information and communication technologies (ICT) in both personal and school environments. Consequently, actions have been taken that contribute to more responsible use of this type of technology in students' personal, school, and social lives.

In 2015, Dakota Lawson and Bruce B. Henderson performed a study to examine the relationship between mobile phone use in class and information comprehension. The study involved 120 students from an introductory psychology course, mostly first-year students. The result showed that students who were texting in the class had significantly lower test scores even when the material that was presented was simple: mobile phone use in class impairs students’ comprehension and performance. This study was performed after several similar studies in the past and corroborated their results.

Furthermore, researchers Julia Irwin and Natasha Gupta of Macquarie University performed an experiment in 2016 testing the effect of Facebook-related distractions in the classroom. The researchers found that students who were interested in the subject material and the way it was presented were less likely to be distracted by Facebook. However, the students with access to phones still performed poorer than students that were not allowed access to cell phones during the lecture.

A 2017 collective study, published by Applied Cognitive Psychology, indicated that college students retained less knowledge when allowed to use or possess a cell phone during lectures. During the experiment, students who were not allowed access to a cell phone tested better than those who had access to cell phones.

Despite the numerous drawbacks that come with the use of cell phones in classrooms, there are benefits to having them available in a school setting. In 2017, Dr. James Derounian conducted a study involving a hundred participants at the University of Gloucestershire. His study revealed that 45% of students believe that the use of phones in classrooms supports their education. One of the most commonly mentioned ways that phones provided such academic support was digital access to textbooks. The ability to access scholarly material on mobile devices allowed students to engage more deeply with the information presented. Still, Derounian mentioned that there could be "an element of social desirability conveyed in the student views given."

An article by Emma Henderson, a journalist for the United Kingdom (UK) publication The Independent, describes phantom vibrations caused by "learned bodily behavior," where the part of the body to which the phone is closest becomes very sensitive. As a result, even the slightest vibrations can cause a person to believe that the phone has vibrated when, in reality, it has not. These are known as phantom vibrations. Nine out of ten people claimed to have felt these phantom vibrations in their pockets, raising serious concerns about the overuse of cell phones and the resulting dependency that people develop. Therefore, breaking the habit of frequently checking one's phone can not only be beneficial for students but also convey more respect towards the professors and teachers whose lectures are constantly interrupted by cellular distractions.

Regulations by country

Australia
In Australian schools, mobile phones are advised to be used only in case of calls to parents or guardians and that only if the parent or guardian allows the phone to be used to during school activities such as school excursions, camps and extra-curricular activities at school.

Mobile phones with cameras are restricted within school premises while entirely banned within certain sections such as changing rooms, bathrooms, gyms and swimming pools. They are only allowed to film or take photographs of people only with their signed permission or, if the person is under eighteen, to have a parent or guardian to give a sign permission note allowing for these actions. If a student is found with a mobile phone or devices within these areas, they will be confiscated; and, depending on the situation, charges or consequences will be given.

Mobile phones are not allowed to be used for sending harassing or threatening messages. If a student does commit such an act, higher authorities will become involved, including the police since this being a violation of privacy and harassment. Due to bullying, privacy and harassment issues being a major issue in Australia, if a student or teacher does break this law, it may leave them with a criminal record, leaving them at a disadvantage in the future.

Mobile phones are discouraged in terms of their use within the classroom unless they can be appropriately incorporated into the learning environment. "We want to ensure mobile phones and other smart devices complement students' learning and are handled at school in an age-appropriate way," said Premier Gladys Berejiklian in an ABC news article.

Australian educational institutes have been divided on whether phones should really be banned in the classrooms or only allowed to be used for certain amounts of time during school hours, but the New South Wales government has banned phones completely from its primary schools since 2019. "Technology should be there to help a child learn. It should not be there to upset them or make them feel uncomfortable," according to Premier Gladys Berejiklian.

The reason for banning phones is to stop bullying both online and physically and to remove distractions from the classrooms. "Mobile phones, unfortunately, are not only distracting but also causing stress for young children—and we can't have that continue," NSW Premier Gladys Berejiklian told Seven's Sunrise. This will be implemented by removing students’ access to phones during the day unless a parent or guardian requests that the student needs to use it. The teacher will always have the phone kept with him somewhere where the student is still able to access it before and after school.

China 
Ever since November 2018, all primary and secondary schools in China's Shandong province have banned the use of mobile phones in classrooms. In February 2021, China announced that children would be banned from using mobile phones in schools unless they have written parental consent.

France 
Mobile phones have been prohibited for students from 3 to 15 years of age, since September 2018. In December 2017, the minister of education Jean-Michel Blanquer issued a directive banning the use of smartphones in schools by children up to the age of 15.

Greece 
It is forbidden by law and the use of mobile phones by students is not allowed in the school premises to either take or make mobile phone calls, texting, or the use of other camera, video or other recording devices or medium that have image and audio processing system like smartwatches, headphones. Students must switch off their mobile phones or set to silent mode and keep them in their bags.

Iran 
In Iran, students are not allowed to bring their phones to school; the punishment of doing so is 3 to 7 days of suspension.

Some schools may confiscate students mobile phone until the academic year ends.

Malaysia
For schools under the Malaysian Ministry of Education, it is a disciplinary offence for students to bring their phones to school as well as to the dormitories of boarding schools. Students are expected to use the school's public phones or borrow a teacher's mobile phone in the case of an emergency. Phones brought to school will be confiscated and the parents of the students who brought the phones will be notified to retrieve the phones. If the student is a first-time offender, a warning will be issued. The student and their parents will also have to sign a letter of undertaking in which the student promises not to bring their phone to school again. If the student is a repeating offender, they will be restricted from using school or dormitory facilities or will be excluded from school programs or activities. The standard operating procedures and punishments however, may vary by school.

Turkmenistan 
Since 2020, all secondary schools in Turkmenistan have banned the use of mobile phones during lessons in order to increase the productivity of the educational process. The ban applies not only to school children, but also to teachers: now, during the lessons, they must put their phones on silent mode. Pupils can only use phones outside the school.

United Kingdom
In the UK, a survey showed that there were no mobile phone bans in schools in 2001 but by 2007, 50% of schools had banned mobile phones during the school day. This number increased to 98% by 2012. These bans were implemented by either forbidding students from bringing phones onto school premises or by making students hand their phones in at the beginning of the day. According to a study by the London School of Economics, students' academic performance improved when policies were implemented to ban cell phone usage in schools. This ban not only helped students score higher on exams but also reduced the students' temptation to use cell phones for non-scholarly purposes.

Secondary schools are introducing new, strict laws on mobile phones where students under sixteen years of age will have to put their phones away for the entire day after scientific evidence has demonstrated that students become more sociable, alert and active in the school environment without them. Students place their phones inside a registered locker when they arrive at school and are only allowed to retrieve them once school has finished. With this happening, schools have found a positive impact on the students: more students are active outside, along with greater numbers attending clubs and social events. Nick Gibb told The Times, "I believe very strongly that children should be limiting their own [phone] use at home. Every hour spent online and on a smartphone is an hour less talking to family, and it's an hour less exercise and it's an hour less sleep. And of course, it is a lack of sleep that research is showing can have a damaging effect on a child's mental health."

The schools did note that the positive impact was greater for students under the age of eleven rather than in older students. In fact, it was shown that older students actually suffered from a restricted use of learning platforms on their phones such as educational apps assisting in studying or learning skills. Students that were caught with their mobile phones between the school time period were given punishments such as detention, expulsion or warnings. In doing so, children have been taught to limit the amount of time they spend online and focus more on their school lives along with other social activities. Nevertheless, people in England have argued against this. Patsy Kane has stated, "There's a fantastic range of apps now for revision—and the students are really motivated to use them."

United States
In the past, some United States schools installed mobile phone jammers to prevent cell phones from working on campuses. However, the sale and use of jammers is illegal in the US under the Federal Communications Act of 1934, because jammers cut off 9-1-1 calls and can disrupt air navigation if they are used near airports. In 2012, the Federal Communications Commission (FCC) became stricter in enforcing the ban on jammers. Mt. Spokane High School in Washington state once installed a jammer to prevent students from calling and text-messaging but removed the device after it decided that it was "probably not legal" under federal law. In 2015, a Florida science teacher received a five-day unpaid suspension for installing a jammer in his classroom.

In 2005, the New York City Department of Education imposed a citywide ban on mobile phones in public schools. However, according to The New York Times, the ban was "inconsistently enforced, with some schools allowing students to carry phones as long as staff members [did] not hear or see them, and other schools—particularly those with metal detectors at the doors—maintaining a strict ban." The ban was unpopular among parents as well because it impeded communication between them and their children. In March 2015, the citywide ban was lifted, with Mayor Bill de Blasio fulfilling a campaign promise. Under the new policy, school principals in consultation with teachers and parents may set rules on use and storage of mobile phones during instructional time and lunch breaks. While the default rule is that phones must remain hidden, principals may also elect to "require students to store phones in backpacks or other designated places, allow the use of phones during lunch, or allow phones to be used for instructional purposes." De Blasio said that the policy shift would allow parents to stay in better touch with their children, especially in case of an emergency. The New York City Schools Chancellor, Carmen Fariña, supported this policy by noting that the change means that students in schools with metal detectors would no longer have to pay outside vendors to store phones for them during the school day.

When asked which type of phone-restriction policy they prefer, students tended to support the side that grants them the opportunity to bring mobile phones onto the school campus, arguing that phones allow them to reach their parents if any problem occurs. In response to the issue of parent-student communication, parents also argue that there is not a replacement for mobile phones and therefore that phones are an essential device for students to have accessible, raising concerns about a child in danger or not feeling safe not being able to contact a parent and receive assistance. Parents also believe that giving a child a phone teaches responsibility. A boarding school in Massachussets banned the use of smart phones, but not digital cameras and laptops, and handed out light phones for basic call and texting.

Theft of mobile phones is another concern in some schools. In 2012, following an undercover investigation, thirteen juvenile students in Bucks County, Pennsylvania, were arrested and charged with running a cell-phone-theft ring that resulted in the theft of several thousand dollars worth of mobile phones, tablets, and other electronics.

An increasing number of schools are now allowing the use of cell phones as learning tools. However, the collective use of cell phones in schools poses other technological challenges. Some schools reported that allowing all students to use cell phones at the same time slows down school bandwidth speeds, and hence some schools have blocked phones from accessing the school Wi-Fi.
 
Phone use in schools is not just an issue for students and teachers but also for other employees of educational institutions. According to the Governors Highway Safety Association, while no state bans all mobile phone use for all drivers, twenty states and the District of Columbia prohibit school bus drivers from using mobile phones. School bus drivers have been fired or suspended for using their phones or text-messaging while driving.

Messaging applications
Cellphone applications have been created to support the use of phones in school environments. As of February 2018, about 80,000 applications are available for teacher use. A variety of messaging apps provide communication for student-to-student relationships as well as teacher-to-student communication. Some popular apps for both students, teachers, and parents are Remind and ClassDojo. About 72% of top-selling education apps on iOS are for preschoolers and elementary school students. These apps offer many different services such as language translation, scheduled reminders and messages to parents.

The app Remind is another way for teachers to communicate with parents and school administration. This app not only allows teachers to send out scheduled text messages to parents but also provides a class blog for teachers to share upcoming due dates, tests and quizzes, and other class information.

Another app that allows students to communicate with one another is GroupMe. GroupMe allows students to communicate in a group-chat format through Wi-Fi instead of using cellular data. Even some college-aged students use this app for sharing course information.

Technology in schools is becoming a common academic feature throughout many grade levels and age groups. The creation of messaging applications helps support this boom of phone usage in schools. An advantage of messaging apps is their easy usage and accessibility for students, teachers, and parents. These apps make efficient communication easier for parents with disabilities, parents with demanding full-time jobs, or parents with language barriers. One disadvantage to cell phone usage in schools is that not all students and parents have this technology available to them. This can cause a socioeconomic gap between students who have cell phones and computers and those who do not. Another problem is that the ease of sharing of information can lead to academic dishonesty. Colleges and universities, in particular, have had many issues with academic dishonesty by digital sharing of tests and other sensitive materials. As a result, these institutions are becoming more strict with their policies and increasing the severity of consequences for committing plagiarism and other acts of academic dishonesty.

With time, messaging applications will be consistently improved. If administrators, teachers, and policy-makers work hard to minimize both student and parent entitlement, set communication boundaries, state expectations early, and reinforce student responsibility, some of the problems caused by messaging apps can be reduced or eliminated.

See also
 Mobile learning
 Social media in education

References

External links
 Cell Phones in American High Schools: A National Survey, Journal of Technology Studies
 Huang, G. (2013). Research Issues and Applications of Mobile and Ubiquitous Learning
Schools
School and classroom behaviour